The 2015 Quebec Scotties Tournament of Hearts, the provincial women's curling championship of Quebec, were held from January 12 to 18 at Complexe Sportif Sani Marc in Victoriaville, Quebec. The Lauren Mann rink from Montreal won the event and represented Quebec at the 2015 Scotties Tournament of Hearts. The event was held in conjunction with the 2015 Quebec Men's Provincial Curling Championship.

Teams
The teams are listed as follows:

Round robin standings
Final Round Robin Standings

Round robin results

Draw 1
Monday, January 12, 8:15 am

Draw 2
Monday, January 12, 3:30 pm

Draw 3
Tuesday, January 13, 8:15 am

Draw 4
Tuesday, January 13, 3:45 pm

Draw 5
Wednesday, January 14, 8:15 am

Draw 6
Wednesday, January 14, 3:45 pm

Draw 7
Thursday, January 15, 12:00 pm

Draw 8
Thursday, January 15, 7:30 pm

Draw 9
Friday, January 16, 12:00 pm

Draw 10
Friday, January 16, 7:30 pm

Tiebreaker
Saturday, January 17, 8:15 am

Playoffs

Semifinal
Saturday, January 17, 3:45 pm

Final
Sunday, January 18, 9:30 am

References

Quebec Scotties Tournament of Hearts
Curling competitions in Quebec
Sport in Victoriaville
Scotties Tournament of Hearts
Quebec Scotties Tournament of Hearts